Bakel Airport  is an airport serving Bakel, a town in Bakel department, Tambacounda region, Senegal.

References

External links
 

Airports in Senegal
Tambacounda Region